"Gimme" is a single by rock singer Alice Cooper, released in 2000.

The song appeared on Cooper's album Brutal Planet, and was its first and only single. Its highest chart position was 103 in the UK. The song was written by Cooper and Bob Marlette.

The song is about a deal with the Devil, sung from the point of view of Satan. This is a recurring theme for Cooper, and a motif he uses in songs like "I'm The Coolest" from 1976's Alice Cooper Goes to Hell and "I Just Wanna Be God" on Dragontown, the follow-up album to Brutal Planet. The lyrics also make a reference to "Nothing's Free" from The Last Temptation, another song with the same theme.

Music video
A music video was produced to promote the single.

Album appearances
Brutal Planet
Alice Cooper: Brutally Live
Dragontown bonus disc
Frezno Smooth Original Soundtrack
Live at Montreux 2005

Personnel
Alice Cooper - Vocals
Ryan Roxie - Guitar
Phil X. - Guitar 
China - Guitar
Eric Singer - Drums
Bob Marlette - Rhythm guitar, Bass, Keyboards

Charts

References

2000 singles
Alice Cooper songs
Music based on the Faust legend
Songs written by Alice Cooper
Songs written by Bob Marlette
Song recordings produced by Bob Marlette
2000 songs